Graham Schodde (born 19 June 1958) is  a former Australian rules footballer who played with St Kilda in the Victorian Football League (VFL).

Notes

External links 
		

Living people
1958 births
Australian rules footballers from New South Wales
St Kilda Football Club players
North Albury Football Club players